Atomic Planet Entertainment Ltd was a British video game developer based in Middlesbrough, England. It was founded in 2000 by Darren and Jason Falcus, the brothers who previously managed Acclaim Studios Teesside.

History 
APE's first title was Dino Island for Orange mobile phone systems this was followed by Mike Tyson Heavyweight Boxing title for the PlayStation 2 and Xbox, released in 2002. A series of titles for the Game Boy Advance system followed. The company progressed with a port of Super Puzzle Fighter II Turbo and Robin Hood: Defender of the Crown for Capcom, both in 2003. In 2004, some staff numbers hit almost 70. Titles in development at this time included Jackie Chan Adventures for Sony Computer Entertainment, Miami Vice for Davilex, Gametrak: Dark Wind for In2Games, and the Mega Man Anniversary Collection. In 2005, Taito Legends was published by Empire Interactive, reworking some of Taito's video games classics for the current consoles. In 2006, Atomic Planet produced a number of titles for platforms for the Wii and DS, including Jenga, AMF Bowling Pinbusters, Sea Monsters: A Prehistoric Adventure and Arctic Tale.

In 2009, the company went into administration after a number of redundancies.

Games developed 
2000: Dino Island (Mobile);
2002: Mike Tyson Heavyweight Boxing (Xbox)Aero the Acro-Bat (GBA);
2003: Zapper (GBA)Super Puzzle Fighter II Turbo (GBA)Superstar Dance Club (PSone)Sennari Darts (Mobile)Robin Hood: Defender of the Crown (Xbox, PC);
2004: Mega Man Anniversary Collection (PS2, GameCube, Xbox)Jackie Chan Adventures (PS2)Gametrak: Dark Wind (PS2 with Gametrak Controller)Miami Vice (PS2, Xbox, PC);
2005: 10 Pin: Champions Alley (PS2)Ultimate Pro Pinball (PS2, Xbox)Stealth Force: The War on Terror (PS2, PC)Perfect Ace 2 (PS2, PC)Taito Legends (PS2, Xbox, PC)Red Baron (PS2, PC)SAS Anti-Terror Force (PS2, PC)WWII: Soldier (PS2, PC);
2006: Daemon Summoner (PS2)Taito Legends 2 (PS2, Xbox, PC)Family Feud (PS2, PC, GBA);Beverly Hills Cop (PS2)
2007: Charlotte's Web (PS2)Top Gun (PS2)Bob the Builder: Festival of Fun (PS2)History Channel: Great Battles of Rome (PS2, PSP)AMF Bowling Pinbusters (Wii)Jenga World Tour (Wii, NDS)Arctic Tale (Wii, NDS);
2008: Sea Monsters: A Prehistoric Adventure (PS2, Wii, NDS)The Water Horse: Legend of the Deep (PS2, NDS)Skyscraper (PC, PS2, Wii)Real Madrid: The Game (PC, PS2, PSP, NDS, Wii);
2009: Stealth Force 2 (PC, PS2).

References 

Defunct video game companies of the United Kingdom
Video game companies established in 2000
Video game companies disestablished in 2009
Video game development companies
Defunct companies based in Yorkshire